The 1974 Australian Rally Championship was a series of seven rallying events held across Australia. It was the seventh season in the history of the competition.

Colin Bond and navigator George Shepheard in the Holden Dealer Team Holden Torana GTR XU-1 were the winners of the 1974 Championship.

Season review

The seventh Australian Rally Championship was expanded to seven events now venturing to the West with the first ever round to be staged in Western Australia.  This season consisted of two events in Victoria and one each in Queensland, New South Wales, South Australia and Western Australia. 1974 was to be the last year of domination from the Holden Torana GTR XU-1's. Bond and Shepheard had four wins and a second to win the championship, but had increasing opposition from the Datsun 240Z's of Stewart McLeod/Adrian Mortimer and Ross Dunkerton/John Large.

The Rallies

The seven events of the 1974 season were as follows.

Round One – Semperit 1600

Round Two – Akademos Rally

Round Three – Bega Valley Rally

Round Four – Uniroyal Southern Rally (Walkerville)

Round Five – Warana Rally

Round Six – Bunbury-Curran Rally

Round Seven – Alpine Rally

1974 Drivers and Navigators Championships
Final pointscore for 1974 is as follows.

Colin Bond – Champion Driver 1974

George Shepheard – Champion Navigator 1974

References

Rally Championship
Rally competitions in Australia
1974 in rallying